Murcia del Carmen railway station is the main railway station in the Spanish city of Murcia.

Services
The Cercanías Murcia/Alicante commuter rail network connects Murcia del Carmen with Alicante railway station and Águilas through lines C-1 and C-2. Alvia high speed services use the Madrid–Levante high-speed rail network as far as Albacete, then the classic rail tracks to Murcia and on to Cartagena. Talgo services also operate to Valencia Nord and Barcelona Sants.

Future
The AVE high-speed rail system is due to be extended to Murcia in 2022 as part of the Madrid–Levante high-speed rail  network, (and later, in 2023, as the starting point for the Murcia–Almería high-speed rail line) with platforms and track possibly being relocated underground. In October 2017, protesters against the underground alignment blocked the track leading to the station, leading to multiple train cancellations.

References

Railway stations in the Region of Murcia